Anthony David Graham, AM (born 23 May 1946) is a former professional golfer from Australia. He won eight times on the PGA Tour, including two major championships.

Early life
Graham is from Tasmania, Australia. He is a natural left-hander but "converted" into a right-hander.

Professional career 
At the age of 14, Graham began his first job as an assistant professional at Riversdale Golf Club in Melbourne, Australia. In 1967, he started working at a sporting goods store in Sydney, New South Wales. During this time he honed his golf skills at Royal Sydney Golf Club under the tutelage of Alec Mercer, the club professional. He stated later, "Alec taught me all I know. When I arrived in Sydney two years ago I could hardly play and he taught me everything. I've been lucky, I've had financial sponsorships and lots of advice, but Alec stuck with me through thick and thin and I owe all my success and good fortune to him." In early 1968, Graham started working full-time as a touring professional.

Australian and Asian circuits 
Among the first tournaments Graham received media attention for was the Brisbane Water Tournament. Graham opened with a 68 (−1) to put him three back of lead. In the second round he shot a 73 (+4) but in the difficult conditions he moved into a tie for third. The Canberra Times opined that Graham, "looks like being a threat as the tournament moves into its third round." The third round was cancelled due to rain. In the final round Graham shot a 72 to finish solo fourth, four behind champion Bob Shaw.

The following year, 1969, would be Graham's first season of continuous success. In February he played the two-round $3,500 Amoco Open at Forbes, New South Wales. He finished in a tie for third with Ted Ball and Walter Godfrey, four back of champion Tony Mangan.

Shortly thereafter, he moved onto the Asia Golf Circuit. In mid-March he finished joint second at the Malaysian Open with New Zealand's John Lister, one behind champion Takaaki Kono. At this point he was in third place on the Asia Golf Circuit's Order of Merit. The following week he played the Singapore Open. After three rounds he was at 209, one back of leaders Tomio Kamata of Japan and Guy Wolstenholme of England. On the front nine he shot a 34 to distance himself from the remainder of the field. According to The Straits Times, "only Graham remained in contention with the two leaders." Graham made up one stroke on the leaders during the back nine to enter a playoff with them. Graham and Kamata parred the first hole of the playoff while Wolstenholme bogeyed to drop out. Graham and Kamata made pars at the par-3 2nd hole. At the par-4 3rd hole Kamata made his birdie while Graham was "short by two inches." Graham finished second. After these two runner-ups finishes, Graham was considered "the find of this year's tour." The next tournament Graham played was the Hong Kong Open. He shot a 69 (−1) to put him near the lead. In the second round he shot another 69 (−1) to move closer. However, he shot over-par in the final two rounds to finish in a tie for 14th place. Graham cited his poor putting for his weak play. He fell to 7th in the Order of Merit. Still, Graham was optimistic about his future. He told AAP-Reuters after the round, "My good performance here has left with a great chance of being nominated for the Alcan tournament in the states, which is what I'm really after. After my placings in Singapore and Kuala Lumpur it will make it very difficult for anyone to catch me in the last two tournaments in Taipei and Toyko, and beat me for Alcan." By early April he was in 2nd place on the Order of Merit, only behind Taiwan's Hsieh Yung-yo.

Shortly thereafter he returned to Australia. In June he played a $1,650 purse at Goolwa, South Australia at South Lakes Golf Course. He opened the two-round tournament with a 73 to put him several strokes behind the lead. However, in the final round he shot a 70 to defeat John Lister by one stroke.

As of August 1969, Graham had qualified for the Alcan International, an elite international tournament on the PGA Tour to be held in September, "on the strength of his sound performances on the Far East Circuit." Graham opened the tournament with a 74 (+2) to put him five behind the lead. He eventually finished in 22nd place among the 24 players in the field, 23 shots behind champion Billy Casper. After the tournament he intended to try out of the PGA Tour at the Fall 1969 PGA Tour Qualifying School.

Shortly thereafter, he returned to Australia. In October he played the City of Sydney Open. Graham fired a "brilliant" final round to "snatch fourth place." Later in the month he played the Australian Open. He shot a second round 69 to move into a tie for fifth, only behind Guy Wolstenholme, Bruce Devlin, Peter Thomson, and Gary Player. However, he was not near the lead as the tournament concluded. In November he played the North Coast Open in Coffs Harbour, New South Wales. Due to his recent good play he was the "favorite" at the event. He opened poorly with a 75 but "recovered" with a 71 to put him one back. He ultimately finished in solo second place at 294 (+6), three back of champion Tony Mangan. In December he played the Caltex Tournament at Paraparaumu Links Golf Course in Wellington, New Zealand. He opened at 142, even-par, to put him in a tie for third. However, over the course of the two-round final day Graham shot six-over-par and finished in a tie for fourteenth.

Early the following year, Graham won two events in Australia. In February, he played the Tasmanian Open at Kingston Beach Golf Club. Right before the tournament began he played the one-round $750 Golden Crumpet Purse, also at Kingston Beach. He shot a 68 (−5) to tie Terry Kendall for second place, two behind champion Tony Mangan. At the tournament proper Graham was tied for the lead with Alan Murray at the end of the third round, one ahead of Terry Kendall. Kendall, however, played excellently during the front nine of the final round and took a four-stroke lead by the 11th hole. Kendall "crashed over the concluding holes" though and by the 16th hole Graham had regained the lead. With a birdie at the 17th hole he "clinched the title." With a final round 72, Graham defeated Kendall by one. The next week he played the Victorian Open. He opened at 136 (-10), in a tie for second, two off the lead of Guy Wolstenholme. He played well in the third round to take the lead. During the front nine Graham "shook off the big-name challengers" like Kel Nagle and Guy Wolstenholme to create a four-shot lead at the turn. Graham birdied the 10th hole to take a five-shot lead over amateur Kevin Hartley. However, after bogey-birdie exchanges with Hartley at the 11th and 12th holes  Graham's lead was suddenly down to one. At the par-5 13th hole, however, Hartley hit a "poor chip" and had to settle for par while Graham made a "morale-boosting" eight-foot birdie putt to expand the lead. At the par-3 14th hole Hartley's approach was short and he made bogey. Graham now had a three stroke lead. Graham cruised home from there and defeated Hartley, Nagle, and Wolstenholme by four shots. His 273 (-19) total broke Yarra Yarra Golf Club's course record, set by Gary Player in 1959, by two shots. According to a journalist for The Canberra Times, "The win, Graham's second state open triumph in eight days, sounded an ominous warning to Australia's aging golf greats that he is heir-apparent to their crowns."

The following week Graham played the New South Wales Open played at Pymble Golf Course in Sydney, Australia. Graham was at 209 (-7) after three rounds but was five behind leader Kel Nagle. Nagle played poorly on the front nine, however, letting Graham and the rest of the field back into contention. However, Graham, with erratic play on the front nine, failed to take advantage. At the par-4 7th Graham hit his drive out of bounds leading to double-bogey. He ultimately shot an even-par 36, with only four pars, and was still behind. Starting at the 13th hole, however, Graham started to play well, making birdie. Graham he birdied three of the next four holes to get closer. At the 477-yard par-5 18th hole Graham hit his second shot into a bunker. He hit his sand shot to 18 feet. His "chances of birdie looked remote"  but he holed the putt creating a "tremendous roar" from the gallery. He took a one stroke-lead over Frank Phillips. However, Phillips, playing behind, hit his second shot on the 18th hole to 10-feet giving him a chance for eagle and the outright win. Phillip's eagle putt, however, "hung on the lip" and "he had to be content with a birdie four to tie Graham." He entered an 18-hole playoff with Phillips the following day. The playoff was considered to be "one of the greatest in the history of NSW open." Graham was behind for most of the playoff but "staged a great fightback" and tied by the 15th hole. However, Phillips birdied the final two holes to defeat Graham by two strokes. There were nine birdies between the two players in the round.

Shortly thereafter, Graham moved onto the Asia Golf Circuit. In March 1970, he played the Thailand Open. During the final round he "came from three strokes behind" to win the event at 286 (-2). The following month he played the Yomiuri International in Japan, also on the Asian circuit. With consecutive rounds of 71 (-1) Graham took the lead at 142 (-2). Graham fell into the joint lead with New Zealander Walter Godfrey after a third round 75 (+3). However, Graham "began the final round in fine style by sinking a 15ft putt." Graham went on to birdie the final two holes to win by three over Godfrey. He defeated third place finisher, Tommy Aaron, the "pre-tournament favorite," by four shots. With the victory, Graham won A$10,500 and a Japanese car.

Later in the year he played some significant international events. In June he played in the Western Open on the PGA Tour. As of July, he had qualified for the 1970 British Open. In October he played the Australian Open at Kingston Heath Golf Club. However, he "crashed" with an opening round 79 (+7).

In early November, Graham attempted to qualify for the PGA Tour at 1970 PGA Tour Qualifying School in Tucson, Arizona. He opened with rounds of 72. However, ultimately failed to qualify by one stroke.

Later in the month it was announced that Graham would represent Australia at the 1970 World Cup with Bruce Devlin. The event would be held at the Jockey Club in Buenos Aires, Argentina. It took a 54-hour plane trip for both Graham and Devin to reach Argentina and both were "tired" once they started playing the first round. However, both played excellently in the opening round. Graham fired a bogey-free 65 (−7) and Devlin a bogey-free 66 (−6). At 131 (−13), they held a three-stroke lead over Argentina's team. In the individual competition, Graham was in solo second, one behind leader Roberto De Vicenzo of Argentina, while Devlin was tied for third. After the round Graham stated, "I don't regard it as my best performance ever, but it is pretty close." In the second round Graham shot a 67 (−5) while Devlin shot a 69 (−3). In the third round Graham shot a back nine 30 (−7), including birdies on the final four holes, to record at 65 (−7). Devlin recorded a third round 66 (−6). They held a 19-stroke lead over Argentina, the second place team. After the round, according to The Canberra Times, "Graham said the three rounds here were the so far were the best he's ever played." Among individuals, Graham held a two-stroke lead over Roberto De Vicenzo. At the beginning of the final round both Graham and his partner Devlin played poorly shooting 35 and 36, respectively, over the course of the par-35 front nine. In addition, Graham lost the solo individual lead to de Vicenzo when Graham bogeyed the par-3 8th hole and the Argentine birdied it. According to the Papua New Guinea Post-Courier, however, at the end of the front nine the Australians "were assured of victory over their nearest rivals Argentina." At his point their team still had an 11 stroke lead over Argentina. Among individuals, "The lead see-sawed back and forth until De Vicenzo took the lead for good with a birdie on the par-5 15th." Graham finished second among individuals. The Australian team won by nine shots. At 544, they beat the team record set by Arnold Palmer and Jack Nicklaus at the 1966 Canada Cup by four shots. According to the Associated Press, Graham "was hailed today as one of golf's potential greats" after the victory.

Two weeks later, in December, Graham played the Argentine Masters. Over the course of the first two rounds, Graham opened with rounds of 69 (−1) to be one behind the lead of Roberto De Vicenzo. At this point, he was tied for second with Gary Player and Argentine Juan Quinteros. However, de Vicenzo would go on to win the tournament while Graham would finish outside of the top 3.

PGA Tour 
In late 1971 Graham attempted to qualify for the PGA Tour at 1971 PGA Tour Qualifying School. He was successful. In 1976, he won twice on the PGA Tour, and then came from behind to secure a victory over the reigning champion Hale Irwin in the Piccadilly World Match Play Championship in England.

Graham won two major championships, the 1979 PGA Championship at Oakland Hills near Detroit, and the 1981 U.S. Open at Merion, just west of Philadelphia. He also finished third at the 1985 Open Championship, after sharing the third-round lead. Both of his major victories came in remarkable fashion. In the 1979 PGA Championship, he stood on the last tee at 7 under par for his final round and leading by two, but double-bogeyed the last hole for a 65 to drop back into a playoff with Ben Crenshaw. At each of the first two sudden-death holes he holed long putts to keep the playoff alive and finally won at the third extra hole. At the 1981 U.S. Open, Graham shot a 67 in the final round to overturn a three-shot deficit to overnight leader George Burns to win by 3 strokes. He became the fourth Australian major champion (after Jim Ferrier, Peter Thomson and Kel Nagle) and the first to win a U.S. Open.

Graham participated on the Australian teams that won the World Cup (in 1970) and the Alfred Dunhill Cup (in 1985 and 1986).

Ahead of the 1970 World Cup, the organizing International Golf Association, preferred the more well-known Bruce Crampton to team for Australia with Bruce Devlin. The Australian PGA threatened not to send a team if Graham was not included and Devlin and Graham finally represented Australia and won the team competition by a record eight strokes after holding a record advantage of 19 strokes going into the final round. Graham finished second individually. Devlin and Graham again represented Australia in the 1971 World Cup, but when Devlin was not selected for the event the year after, Graham refused to play and never again participated in any World Cup events.

Another controversy with Graham involved was reported during the inaugural 1985 Dunhill Cup at the Old Course at St Andrews, Scotland. Australia won the team event, with Graham, Greg Norman and Graham Marsh in the team. Prior to the tournament, Marsh had criticized Graham for accepting appearance money for playing in Australian golf tournaments. At the time, Marsh had recently been made an MBE for services to golf and was for six years chairman of the PGA Tour of Australasia. However, Norman took David Graham's side in the debate and Australia went on to win the tournament despite the conflict. In 1986, Australia successfully defended the title with Graham, Norman and Rodger Davis in their team.

At the end of 1981, Graham was ranked 7th on Mark McCormack's world golf rankings.

On 27 June 2004, during the final round of the Bank of America Championship on the Champions Tour, Graham collapsed over a putt on the eighth green. He was later diagnosed with congestive heart failure, ending his competitive golf career at age 58. He is now retired and resides at Iron Horse Golf Club in Whitefish, Montana.

Graham was made a Member of the Order of Australia in 1988 and inducted into the Sport Australia Hall of Fame in 1990.

It was announced on 16 October 2014 that Graham has been elected into the World Golf Hall of Fame. His nomination was supported by Arnold Palmer and Jack Nicklaus. He was inducted with other nominees Mark O'Meara, course architect A. W. Tillinghast and Laura Davies  on 13 July 2015 at the University of St Andrews, during the 2015 Open Championship.

Personal life 
Graham married in late 1968.

Professional wins (37)

PGA Tour wins (8)

PGA Tour playoff record (2–1)

European Tour wins (3)

European Tour playoff record (1–0)

Japan Golf Tour wins (1)

Japan Golf Tour playoff record (0–1)

PGA Tour of Australasia wins (6)

PGA Tour of Australasia playoff record (0–1)

Asia Golf Circuit wins (2)
1970 Thailand Open, Yomiuri International

British PGA wins (1)
 1970 French Open

Caribbean Tour wins (1) 

 1971 Caracas Open

Other Japan wins (2)
1971 Japan Airlines Open
1980 Rolex Japan

Other Australian wins (4)
1967 Queensland PGA Championship
1970 Tasmanian Open, Victorian Open
1994 Australian Skins

Other Latin American wins (3)
 1978 Mexico Cup
 1980 Mexican Open, Heublein Open (Brazil)

Other wins (3)

Senior PGA Tour wins (5)

Senior PGA Tour playoff record (1–1)

Major championships

Wins (2)

1Defeated Crenshaw with birdie on third extra hole.

Results timeline

CUT = missed the halfway cut (3rd round cut in 1971, 1977 and 1984 Open Championships)
WD = withdrew
"T" indicates a tie for a place.

Summary

Most consecutive cuts made – 20 (1979 U.S. Open – 1984 U.S. Open)
Longest streak of top-10s – 3 (1979 U.S. Open – 1980 Masters)

Team appearances
World Cup (representing Australia): 1970, 1971
Dunhill Cup (representing Australia): 1985 (winners), 1986 (winners), 1988
Nissan Cup (representing Australasia): 1985, 1986

See also 

 1971 PGA Tour Qualifying School graduates

References

External links

Australian male golfers
PGA Tour golfers
PGA Tour Champions golfers
Winners of men's major golf championships
World Golf Hall of Fame inductees
Members of the Order of Australia
Sport Australia Hall of Fame inductees
People from Whitefish, Montana
1946 births
Living people